Protopanaxatriol (PPT) is an organic compound characterizing a group of ginsenosides. It is a dammarane-type tetracyclic triterpene sapogenins found in ginseng (Panax ginseng) and in notoginseng (Panax pseudoginseng).

See also
 Panaxatriol
 Protopanaxadiol

References

Triterpenes
Tetrols
Steroids